Clara Coltman Vyvyan (née Rogers; 1885 – 1 March 1976) was an Australian-born travel writer. She published under the names C. C. Rogers and C. C. Vyvyan.

Biography 
Vyvyan was born in 1885 on her family's cattle station in Stanage, Queensland, Australia. Her mother Charlotte Williams was from Cornwall, England, and her father, Edward Powys Rogers, was a member of the Coltman Rogers family of Stanage Park in Powys, Wales. In 1887 the family returned to live in Cornwall, although they continued to spend 6 months a year in Queensland; Vyvyan and her sister were educated by a governess at home. Vyvyan later studied at the Women's University Settlement in London, England, and became a social worker.

During World War I, Vyvyan served as a nurse at Rouen, France. After the war ended, she travelled across Canada and Alaska, writing articles for publication.

In 1929, Vyvyan married Sir Courtenay Bourchier Vyvyan, the 10th Vyvyan baronet. When he died 12 years later, she inherited Trelowarren estate and house. Her close friend Daphne du Maurier used the house and gardens as settings for her novels Frenchman's Creek and Rebecca.

Publications 
 Vyvyan, C. C. (1931). Gwendra Cove, and other Cornish sketches. Truro: Jordan's Bookshop.
 Vyvyan, C. C. (1933). Bird Symphony: An anthology. London: J. Murray.
 Vyvyan, C. C. (1948). Our Cornwall, with drawings by Elizabeth Rivers. London: Westaway Books.
 Vyvyan, C. C. ([1952]) The Old Place. Illustrated by Elizabeth Rivers. London: Museum Press.
 Vyvyan, C. C. (1955). Down the Rhône on Foot. London: Peter Owen.
 Vyvyan, C. C. (1955). Temples and Flowers: A journey to Greece. London: Peter Owen.
 Vyvyan, C. C. (1957). On Timeless Shores: Journeys in Ireland. Leicester: Ulverscroft.
 Vyvyan, C. C. (1959). A Cornish Year. London: Country Book Club.
 Vyvyan, C. C. (1960). The Scilly Isles. London: Robert Hale.
 Vyvyan, C. C. (1963). Roots and Stars: Reflections on the past. London: Country Book Club.
 Vyvyan, C. C. (1965). Coloured Pebbles. London: Country Book Club.
 Vyvyan, C. C. (1972). Letters from a Cornish Garden. London: Michael Joseph.
 Vyvyan, Clara (1998) The ladies, the Gwich'in, and the Rat: travels on the Athabasca, Mackenzie, Rat, Porcupine, and Yukon rivers in 1926, Edmonton, University of Alberta Press
 Vyvyan, C. C. (n.d.) Amateur Gardening: For Pleasure and Profit. London: Museum Press.

See also 
Vyvyan family

References

1885 births
1976 deaths
20th-century Australian writers
Australian travel writers
20th-century Australian women writers
Women travel writers
Wives of baronets
Australian emigrants to the United Kingdom